Playing Columbine is a 2008 American documentary film produced and edited by American independent filmmaker Danny Ledonne. The film follows the video game Super Columbine Massacre RPG! in which players experience the Columbine High School massacre through the eyes of the murderers, Eric Harris and Dylan Klebold.

Film content
In the documentary, critics and supporters of the game are interviewed, including Ledonne, Jack Thompson, Hal Halpin, Doug Lowenstein, Jason Della Rocca, Jenova Chen, Ian Bogost, Tracy Fullerton, Brian Flemming, and the hosts of Free Talk Live. Arguments are made to support the game's inclusion in a growing movement of videogames with social agendas, referencing other independent games such as McDonald's Videogame, Darfur is Dying, JFK Reloaded, and those made by Persuasive Games.

Supporters of video games such as Greg Costikyan note that the medium of the video game is undergoing the same reactionary criticism as previously experienced by comic books, rock and roll, and Dungeons & Dragons. Some argue that video games will gain more mainstream acceptance as more video game players are in positions of power. The film argues that the medium of the video game should no longer be viewed as a child's toy but rather as a mature form of art (see art game).

The film also examines the link drawn by the Toronto Sun and other media outlets between the Columbine videogame and the 2006 Dawson College shooting. The shooter, Kimveer Gill allegedly listed Super Columbine Massacre RPG! as his favorite game. Dawson College student during the shooting; Melissa Fuller is interviewed and dismisses the game's role in the shooting. However, Jack Thompson maintains that the game is a "murder simulator" that "trained" the shooter. The link between the game and the shooting is regarded as an "easy out for society" by then IGDA executive director Jason Della Rocca.

The final section of the film documents the 2007 controversy at the Slamdance Film Festival in which the Columbine videogame was pulled from the Guerrilla Gamemaker Competition by festival director Peter Baxter. In response, University of Southern California pulled its sponsorship of the competition and half of the other game developers pulled their projects out of the festival. The Slamdance documentary jury attempted to award the game a special jury prize but Baxter prevented the award from being given. Eventually, the game screened at other events such as Living Game Worlds in Gijon, Spain and a gallery installation at University of Colorado at Colorado Springs.

Slamdance Festival rejection
The film was rejected from the 2008 Slamdance Film Festival – which the film notes during the end credits. Ian Bogost at Water Cooler Games observed that "It's certainly no surprise that those 'subjective decisions' would include the rejection of the film, which is openly critical of the festival."

Release
Playing Columbine premiered at AFI Fest in Los Angeles, California on November 7, 2008.

It has also screened at Artfutura, the Bradford Animation Festival, the Denver Film Festival, and the Santa Fe Film Festival.

It has been screened in academic venues such as University of Texas at Dallas, Emerson College and Worcester Polytechnic Institute.

The film has been released online via Amazon Video, iTunes, and Netflix.

Reception
Reacting to the trailer for the film released in July 2007, Brian Crecente wrote at the gaming site Kotaku that, "Judging by the rather short trailer, it feels like the documentary is a little too much about Ledonne and not enough about the very real and complicated issues involving both the shooting and the idea of tacking  serious subject matters with video games."

A first look screening of the film at Gamecity in October 2007 prompted Daniel Etherington to write on BBC Collective, "fascinating documentary... Isn’t it time that games were taken seriously?"

He continued:

A review by Anthony Burch at the videogame blog Destructoid wrote:

The film was reviewed by Andrew Barker of Variety in November 2008 and noted:

Mark Fulton of Film Threat wrote:

See also
 Artistic freedom
 Spencer Halpin's Moral Kombat
 Bowling for Columbine-Michael Moore's 2002 Oscar-winning documentary film exploring American gun culture
 Elephant-Gus van Sant's 2003 Palme D'Or-winning film similar in content
 Video games as an art form

References

External links
 
 Official website of Playing Columbine
 Playing Columbine on iTunes
 Playing Columbine on Amazon Video
 Playing Columbine (official trailer)
 Danny Ledonne and Jack Thompson debate on Free Talk Live radio
 "These Games Really Push Our Buttons" MSNBC article featured SCMRPG and Playing Columbine
 SpoutBlog interview with Danny Ledonne
 Independent Films Direct interviews Danny Ledonne

2008 films
American documentary films
Documentary films about video games
Violence in video games
2000s English-language films
2000s American films